Diaspora is the debut album by Belgian singer Natacha Atlas. It was released by Nation Records in March 1995.

Track listing
All tracks written and composed by Natacha Atlas, Count Dubulah, Hamid ManTu and Attiah Ahlan, except where noted.
 "Iskanderia" – 5:15
 "Leysh Nat' Arak" – 6:07
 "Diaspora" (Atlas, Dubulah, ManTu, Ahlan, Neil Sparkes) – 6:47
 "Yalla Chant" – 5:53
 "Alhambra Part 1" (Atlas, Dubulah, ManTu, Ahlan, Larry Whelan) – 1:20
 "Duden" – 6:41
 "Feres" (Atlas, Essam Rashad) – 7:38
 "Fun Does Not Exist" – 5:56
 "Dub Yalil" (Atlas) – 5:56
 "Iskanderia" (Atlas Zamalek) – 5:15
 "Diaspora" (Ballon Theatre mix) - 7:02
 "Fun Does Not Exist" (Dolmus mix) – 6:21

Bonus tracks
All bonus tracks appear on the Japanese edition of Diaspora.
 "Coulishi" – 5:08
 "Duden" (Day Trip to Sousse mix) – 7:00
 "Duden" (Indian Jungle Book mix) – 6:11

Personnel
The following people contributed to Diaspora:

Natacha Atlas – lead vocals, dharabuka
Larry Whelan – saxophone, clarinet
Essam Rashad – oud, violin
Rafiq Rouissi – dharabuka, riq, percussion
Neil Sparkes – dharabuka, backing vocals
Walid Rouissi – backing vocals, oud
Peer Khawam – keyboard
Alex Kasiek – keyboards, guitar
Hamed Mostafa – bass
Ashiqali Hussein, Ali Ahmedaly, Satin Singh – tabla
Hamid Mantu – drums, percussion, keyboards

Nawazish Khan, Amin Abdelazeem, Faed Abdelaal, Hanafi Soliman, Monir Abdelaal, Wael Abubakr – violin
Count Dubulah – bass, guitar
Sokar Al Gohari – accordion
Mostafa Alarab – percussion
Bashir Abdelall – flute
Sameer Benjaman – tambourine  
Simon Walker – strings
Graeme Holdaway – engineering
Mary Farbrother – photography

Charts

References

External links
Official website

1995 debut albums
Natacha Atlas albums
Nation Records albums
MCA Records albums